Ben Johnston may refer to:

 Ben Johnston (rugby union) (born 1978), British rugby player
 Ben Johnston (composer) (1926–2019), American contemporary composer of concert music
 Bennett Johnston, Jr. (born 1932), Washington, D.C.-based lobbyist
 Ben Johnston (Scottish musician) (born 1980), drummer, vocalist, and songwriter with Biffy Clyro
 Ben Johnston (rugby league) (born 1992), English rugby league player

See also
 Ben Johnson (disambiguation)